Ağakişibəyli (also, Agakishibeyli and Agakishi-Bayli) is a village and municipality in the Masally Rayon of Azerbaijan.  It has a population of 1,673.

References 

Populated places in Masally District